The Lake Erie Crushers are a professional baseball team based in Avon, Ohio, a city near the southern shore of Lake Erie. They are members of the West Division of the Frontier League, an independent baseball league which is not affiliated with Major League Baseball. The Crushers won the 2009 Frontier League championship in their inaugural season. They defeated the River City Rascals, three games to two, after losing the first two games of the series.

History
Avon Professional Baseball unveiled the name and logo on Thursday, December 4, 2008, of the Frontier League team that will begin play in Avon. The name was chosen from entries submitted in a "Name the Team" contest sponsored by The Morning Journal. The owner of the team, Steven Edelson, said more than 800 team name ideas were submitted.

After years of talk, Frontier League officials decided to put a team in Lorain County. After initially hinting it would be in Lorain, they decided to go with Avon because, rumor was they were not happy with the stadium Lorain was offering them, which is now known as The Pipe Yard.

The "Name the Team" contest was launched in October, and the hundreds of entries were whittled down. Fans then voted on finalist selections, choosing from Ohio, Lorain County, Avon, Cleveland or Lake Erie for the team location name and the Groove, Ironmen, Red Tails, Artichokes, Crushers, Walleyes, and Woollies for the team name.

In their inaugural season in 2009, the Lake Erie Crushers won the Frontier League championship after a 57-38 regular season. They rallied to eliminate the Kalamazoo Kings, three games to two, before rallying from a 2-0 series deficit to defeat the River City Rascals in the Frontier League Championship Series, 3-2, with a 13-10 Game 5 victory on the road on Sept. 23, 2009.

The Crushers also reached the Frontier League postseason in 2011, 2013, 2014 and 2019. They reached the Frontier League Championship Series once during that span, being swept by the Schaumburg Boomers, three games to none.

In February 2016, Edelson sold the team to Tom & Jacqueline Kramig of Blue Dog Baseball LLC. The Kramigs are on-site owner/operators who are planning several significant upgrades to the team and the ballpark in conjunction with the City of Avon.

On March 15, 2017, the Lake Erie Crushers unveiled new logos and uniforms that allude to the viticulture of the Great Lakes region. Purple and white replaced the original colors of black and red.

Seasons

Current roster

Notable alumni
 Chris Smith (2010)
 Mickey Jannis (2012–2014)
 Robb Paller (2016–2017)
 Travis Hafner (2018)
 Coco Crisp (2019)
 Ryan Feierabend (2021)

Stadium

The Crushers play at Mercy Health Stadium in Avon, Ohio, which has been their home since their inception in 2009.  The stadium, built and owned by the City of Avon, has a capacity of 5,000, including 3,000 box seats, 11 private suites, four-person terrace tables, berm seating and picnic and patio areas for group outings. The playing surface is artificial turf, and includes concession stands, a gift shop and a state-of-the-art sound system.

References

External links
Official site
Frontier League

Frontier League teams
Lorain County, Ohio
Professional baseball teams in Ohio
Baseball teams established in 2009
Baseball teams in Cleveland